Tenacious D in Post-Apocalypto is an American animatic episode series by Jack Black and Kyle Gass as Tenacious D, released independently through the band's YouTube channel. On November 8, 2018, all of the episodes were uploaded as one video branded "full movie".

The soundtrack for the series was released as the band's fourth studio album, Post-Apocalypto by Columbia Records. The stills from the series were used to create a graphic novel released by Fantagraphics Books in September 2020.

Production
In June 2012 when asked about a sequel to Tenacious D in The Pick of Destiny, Black stated that the band had "found a loophole with the internet and animated shorts. That’s the world we’re looking to dive into, and not just for money, mainly for art." The band would mention later on in that year that they may make an Internet series "exclusive to YouTube." The project was a fantasy for Black and Gass for a few years, until the Donald Trump presidential campaign inspired them to start writing a post-apocalyptic comedy in 2016.

The project was assembled by Black physically drawing each frame with markers and notepads, with longtime Tenacious D bassist and producer John Spiker scanning and digitalizing the images. Michael Molina would add color later on in the process.

In December 2017, whilst on Kerrang Radio promoting Jumanji: Welcome to the Jungle, Black stated that the title of the animated series would be called Tenacious D in Post-Apocalypto.

Black and Gass pitched the series to Netflix, HBO Go and Amazon Prime Video for distribution, but it was rejected. The series was ultimately released on YouTube, and revenue came mainly from the accompanying album.

Release
On May 6, 2018, during Tenacious D's performance at the Shaky Knees Music Festival, Black asked the audience if anyone had seen The Pick of Destiny, and that "part two is coming out in October. I don't know where you'll be able to see it, but we've decided it's happening and it's coming out. Rocktober".

On May 15, 2018, the band updated their website and social media platforms with drawings from the series, as well as announcing a 2018 fall US tour through a tour trailer, and releasing new merchandise. On September 4, it was announced that the series would be released on YouTube, with the first episode coming out on September 28. A new episode was released every Friday from then until November 2, to mark the release of the Post-Apocalypto album and the subsequent tour.

The series was screened at the LA Film Festival on September 24, the Fantastic Fest on September 25th, the L.A. Comic Con on October 26, across the Alamo Drafthouse Cinema chain on November 2 and at the Prince Charles Cinema in London on May 31, 2019. It was praised for its commentary on toxic-masculinity & toxic-feminism, comedy, & music.

The second episode was removed from YouTube shortly after being uploaded on October 5 for its sexual content. It was unblocked and had an age-restriction placed on it shortly after.

The series was partially screened as part of the band's Post-Apocalypto Tour, which commenced on November 3, 2018 at the Kings Theatre in Brooklyn, and finished on February 26, 2020 at the Zénith Paris.

Legacy 
In February 2020, whilst on tour in Europe, it was announced that the book would be released in September 2020 as a book by Fantagraphics Books. In September 2020, the band worked alongside American independent comic stores in a virtual book signing with proceeds going to select independent stores.

On April 16, 2021, the band announced a special series of artwork from the series for purchase as non-fungible token, via Makersplace.com

In June 2022, the band released a series of NuGo Nutrition Bars in a limited edition box with artwork from the series and branded 'Fiber D'Lish'.

Episodes

References

Tenacious D
American black comedy films
American rock music films
Animated post-apocalyptic films
YouTube original programming